The Faceless are an American technical death metal band from the Encino neighborhood of Los Angeles. They released their debut album, Akeldama, in November 2006, and a follow-up, Planetary Duality, in November 2008. The band's third album, Autotheism, was released on August 14, 2012. On December 1, 2017, the band released their fourth album, In Becoming a Ghost.

History 
The band was formed in Encino by guitarist Michael Keene and bassist Brandon Giffin in 2004. In the winter of 2005, the band began work on a four-song extended-play album which would become Akeldama. After recording the drum tracks, drummer Brett Batdorf left the band. After a break in the recording process, the band decided to make the EP into a full–length record and recruited several drummers to finish the drum tracks for the remaining songs.

Following the release of Akeldama, the band toured extensively with bands including Necrophagist, Decapitated, Nile, and The Black Dahlia Murder. The band went through several fill-in drummers before adding drummer Lyle Cooper to their line-up.

Planetary Duality débuted at number119 on the Billboard 200. The album was critically acclaimed and brought the band a new level of success.

Soon after its release, they toured with bands including Meshuggah, Lamb of God and In Flames. Prior to their performance at California Metalfest IV, Giffin announced that he would no longer be in the band. The band also announced that they would be playing in The Summer Slaughter Tour of 2010 along with bands including Decapitated, All Shall Perish, and Decrepit Birth.

In May 2011, Keene confirmed via Facebook that Geoffrey Ficco would be replacing Derek Rydquist as the band’s vocalist.

On February 14, 2014, Wes Hauch announced he was leaving the band.

On October 20, 2014, both Evan Brewer and Alex Rüdinger announced on their personal Facebook pages that they were leaving the band to pursue other projects. On December 4, 2014, vocalist Geoffrey Ficco announced his departure from the band, leaving Keene as the sole remaining member of the band.

On February 25, 2015, The Faceless announced Justin McKinney (of The Zenith Passage) as the band's new rhythm guitarist via Facebook.

On April 12, 2015, Michael Keene announced the return of founding member and bassist Brandon Giffin.

On September 28, 2015, The Faceless shared a new song titled: "The Spiraling Void", announced a U.S. tour, and also confirmed via Facebook, the return of long time vocalist Derek "Demon Carcass" Rydquist.

On November 13, 2015, The Faceless made "The Spiraling Void" available for download, via iTunes, Amazon, and Spotify.

On April 18, 2016, The Faceless announced that they would be working under new management through E.J. Shannon Management.

On June 9, 2017, the band announced that they will be playing on the Summer Slaughter Tour 2017 with The Black Dahlia Murder, Dying Fetus and other bands. On the same day, the band released a new song called "Black Star", which featured Ken "Sorceron" Bergeron on vocals, Justin Mckinney on guitar and Chason Westmoreland on drums, also, this is the first The Faceless song on Drop A tuning using seven string guitars. Michael Keene tracked the bass on the entire album by himself. On October 19, 2017, the band announced their fourth full length album entitled In Becoming a Ghost,
which released on December 1, 2017.

On March 19, 2018, vocalist Ken "Sorceron" Bergeron, guitarist Justin McKinney, and drummer Bryce Butler announced they quit the band. Bergeron announced his departure earlier in the day, hours later followed by the other two members. Keene now remains the only member in the band. The new lineup of the band was revealed a month later. The Faceless were expected to perform the entirety of Planetary Duality on June 10, 2018 at Bay Area Deathfest after former member Justin McKinney's band "The Zenith Passage". However, their set was met with criticism after they arrived late and only performed five songs.

On July 24th, 2022, Keene came under fire for arriving on-stage at a concert 45 minutes late, only to begin an apparently-inebriated rant about having a neurological disorder. After touring member Aaron Stechauner got Keene off stage, he performed alone on drums for a time to keep the crowd entertained. The Faceless eventually performed two hours after the set was scheduled.

On July 25, 2022, the band announced that James Dorton of Black Crown Initiate had joined the band as lead vocalist.

Band members
Current members
 Michael Keene – lead guitar (2004–present), clean vocals, vocoder (2006–present), keyboards, programming, sequencing (2007–present), rhythm guitar (2014–2015, 2018–present), bass (2016–present), drums (2018–present)
 James Dorton – lead vocals (2022–present)

Current live/touring members
 Andrew Virrueta – rhythm guitar (2018–present)
 Aaron Stechauner – drums (2018–present)

Former live/touring musicians
 Mica Meneke – lead vocals (2008)
 Nico Santora – rhythm guitar (2014)
 Anthony Barone – drums (2015)
 Julian Kersey – lead vocals (2015, 2018–2022)
 James Knoerl – drums (2017)
 Taylor Wientjes – lead vocals (2018)
 Cody Pulliam – drums (2018)
 Gabe Seeber – drums (2018)
 Jacob Umansky – bass (2018)

Session musicians
 Navene Koperweis – drums (2006)
 Andy Taylor – drums (2006)
 Matthew Blackmar – keyboards (2008)
 Tara Keene – backing vocals (2012)
 Sergio Flores – saxophone (2012), flute (2017)

Former members
 Steve Jones – rhythm guitar (2004–2012)
 Brandon Giffin – bass (2004–2010, 2015–2016)
 Bret Batdorf – drums (2004–2006)
 Jeff Ventimiglia – lead vocals (2004–2005)
 Mikee Domingo – lead vocals (2004; died 2014)
 Zack Graham – drums, clean vocals (2004)
 Bryce Butler – drums (2017–2018)
 Elliott Sellers – drums (2004)
 Michael Sherer – keyboards (2005–2006)
 Derek "Demon Carcass" Rydquist – lead vocals (2006–2011, 2015–2016)
 Nick Pierce – drums (2006)
 Marco Pitruzzella – drums (2007)
 Lyle Cooper – drums (2007–2013)
 Jarrad Lander – bass (2010)
 Geoffrey Ficco – lead vocals (2011–2014)
 Evan Brewer – bass (2011–2014)
 Wes Hauch – rhythm/lead guitar (2012–2014)
 Alex Rüdinger – drums (2013–2014)
 Justin McKinney – rhythm/lead guitar and orchestrations (2015–2018)
 Chason Westmoreland – drums (2015–2017)
 Ken "Sorceron" Bergeron – lead vocals (2016–2018)

Timeline

Discography
Studio albums
 Akeldama (2006)
 Planetary Duality (2008)
 Autotheism (2012)
 In Becoming a Ghost (2017)

Demo albums
 Nightmare Fest (2006)

See also

 List of bands from Los Angeles
 List of progressive metal bands
 List of Sumerian Records artists
 List of technical death metal bands
 Music of Los Angeles

References

External links

 
 

2005 establishments in California
American progressive metal musical groups
American technical death metal musical groups
Death metal musical groups from California
Musical groups established in 2004
Musical groups from Los Angeles
Musical quintets
Sumerian Records artists
American deathcore musical groups